The Pereyaslav Articles were concluded on October 27, 1659 between Yurii Khmelnytsky, the son of Bohdan Khmelnytsky, and the Russian tsar. The treaty drastically limited the Cossack autonomy. The treaty was an aftermath of the Treaty of Hadiach on 16 September 1658 between the Cossacks and the Polish–Lithuanian Commonwealth, which granted many privileges to Cossacks and thus threatened Russian influence over them. The articles imposed severe restrictions on Cossack Hetmanate autonomy.

Terms 
Under the new articles, Ukraine was not allowed to conduct any foreign policy, including military alliances. The Cossacks were not allowed to declare war without the approval of the tsar.

Under the treaty, Muscovite military governors and garrisons were placed in Bratslav, Chernihiv, Nizhyn, Pereiaslav, and Uman (previously, they had been only in Kiev since 1654). Ukrainian Cossack forces were also withdrawn from Belarus. In addition, the Cossacks could no longer elect their own hetmans or colonels without the approval of the tsar.

Aftermath 
The most significant immediate consequence of the Accords was the separation of the  Ukrainian Orthodox Church from the Patriarch of Constantinople and its subordination to the Patriarch of Moscow. The treaty led to popular unrest and later influenced Khmelnytsky's decision to ally with Poland in 1660.

References

See also 
 Treaty of Pereiaslav (1630)
 Pereiaslav Agreement (1654)
The Ruin (Ukrainian history)

1659 in Europe
Treaties of the Cossack Hetmanate
1659 treaties
1659 in Ukraine
Pereyaslav
Russia–Ukraine relations
17th century in the Zaporozhian Host
Bilateral treaties of Russia